Genji monogatari (The Tale of Genji) is an opera by the Japanese composer Minoru Miki, with the libretto by Colin Graham, based on the eponymous early 11th-century masterpiece of classical Japanese literature by Murasaki Shikibu.  The opera was composed in 1999 and premiered in June 2000 at Opera Theatre of Saint Louis (OTSL) in the United States, with Graham directing the production.  Cast members from the OTSL production participated in the Japanese premiere of the opera on 20 September 2001.

The story of the opera is principally derived from the first three books of the novel.

Roles
 Old Emperor  
 Fujitsubo  
 Prince Genji  
 Lady Rokujo  
 To-no-Chujo  
 Kokiden  
 Aoi  
 Suzaku  
 Koremitsu
 Shonagon
 Old recluse of Akashi
 The lady of Akashi

References

External links
 Opera Theatre of Saint Louis page on The Tale of Genji
 Graham's libretto
 Opera Japonica interview with Minoru

Operas
English-language operas
Operas by Miki Minoru
2000 operas
Works based on The Tale of Genji
Operas based on novels